Hinabangan, officially the Municipality of Hinabangan, is a 4th class municipality in the province of Samar, Philippines. According to the 2020 census, it has a population of 13,693 people.

Hinabangan was formed in 1948 from the former municipal districts of Concord and Hinabangan.

Geography

Barangays
Hinabangan is politically subdivided into 21 barangays.

Climate

Demographics

Economy

Education

Primary and elementary schools
Hinabangan has 19 public primary and elementary schools:

High schools
Hinabangan also has two public high schools:
Bagacay National High School
Hinabangan National High School

References

External links
 Hinabangan Profile at PhilAtlas.com
 [ Philippine Standard Geographic Code]
 Philippine Census Information
 Local Governance Performance Management System

Municipalities of Samar (province)